Vedem ([We Are] In the Lead) was a Czech-language literary magazine that existed from 1942 to 1944 in the Terezín concentration camp, during the Holocaust. It was hand-produced by a group of boys living in the Home One barracks, among them editor-in-chief Petr Ginz and Hanuš Hachenburg. Altogether, some 800 pages of Vedem survived World War II.

History of the magazine 
The magazine was written, edited, and illustrated entirely by young boys, aged twelve to fifteen, who lived in Barracks L417, or Home One, which the boys referred to as the Republic of Shkid. The content of Vedem included poems, essays, jokes, dialogues, literary reviews, stories, and drawings. The issues were then copied manually and read around the barracks on Friday night. For some time, it was also posted on the barracks bulletin board; however, it was decided to discontinue this practice because it was deemed dangerous in case of SS inspections.

The inspiration for the authors of Vedem was their teacher, twenty-eight-year-old "Professor" Valtr Eisinger, who was appointed to supervise the boys in that barracks. He fostered their love of literature and encouraged them to express themselves creatively, describing both what they witnessed (often in a humorous tone) and their hopes for the future. It was probably under his influence that the boys adopted a rocket ship, inspired by Jules Verne, flying past a book to a star, as the symbol of their barracks and of their magazine.

Eisinger himself never contributed directly to Vedem, but did add the occasional editorial or translation from Russian. The work itself was done by the boys, who wandered around Terezin looking for themes. Each boy took a nickname to sign their articles. This might have been obscure initials, a pseudonym, or some personal quirk like "Dummy" or "Bolshevik." Sometimes, the nicknames would change. For instance, one prolific contributor, Jiří Grünbaum, called himself "Medic Šnajer," "Socialist Šnajer," or just "Šnajer," depending on his mood. Hanuš Hachenburg contributed several poems and was an avid collaborator. Today, many of the contributors can only be identified by their nicknames, and their true identities are unknown. At some point in 1943, ten of the most prolific contributors began to refer to themselves as the "Academy."

The boys smuggled in art supplies to work on the magazine. They found an abandoned typewriter and used it to create the first 30 issues. The next 53 issues were made by hand after the typewriter ran out of ink. A boy served as lookout as the rest worked on the wooden table in the middle of the bunkroom, or while sitting on their bunks. If a guard approached, he would give a secret signal and the others would hide their work.

One of the outstanding contributors to Vedem was "nz," or Petr Ginz (1928–1944), who at 14 was editor-in-chief of the magazine. At 16, Ginz was deported to Auschwitz, where he was gassed. A drawing by him of the planet Earth as seen from the Moon was taken by Israeli astronaut Ilan Ramon onto the Space Shuttle Columbia, which disintegrated upon its reentry into the Earth's atmosphere.

The boys tried as much as possible to create a real magazine, even jokingly adding a price on the cover. The material included poetry, adventure stories, essays, and book reviews, as well as popular features such as the "Quote of the Week," chosen from among silly things the boys said. For instance, "Medic Šnajer" was once quoted as saying, "I am afraid to speak. I might say something stupid." "Embryo" was quoted as saying, "Football is the best game, right after Monopoly."

In one edition, a review of Uncle Tom's Cabin compares the fate of African American slaves with that of the Jews in Terezín, noting that until the deportations began, African-Americans had it worse because their families were torn apart; afterward, the suffering of the two groups became approximately equivalent. In the popular feature "Rambles through Terezín", Petr Ginz visits various institutions throughout the Ghetto, and interviews people there. His rambles include visits to the bakery, the maternity hospital, the fire station, and a very chilling ramble to the crematorium.

Preservation and publication 
By 1944, most of the inhabitants of Barracks L417 had been deported to the gas chambers of Auschwitz, and no more issues were produced. Of the 92 boys who participated in the effort to produce Vedem, only fifteen survived. Only one of them, Zdeněk Taussig, remained in Terezín until its liberation in May 1945. He had hidden it in a blacksmith shop where his father had worked, and brought it back with him to Prague after he was liberated.

After the war, efforts to publish Vedem were thwarted under the communist regime of Czechoslovakia, but excerpts were smuggled to Paris, where they were printed in the Czech émigré magazine Svĕdectví. A type-written samizdat version was published in Czechoslovakia that same year, and re-released in the 1980s. This version was exhibited in the Frankfurt Book Fair in 1990.

Selections from Vedem, illustrated by art that appeared in the magazine and that was created by other children in Terezín, were published with an introduction by Václav Havel in 1994 as We Are Children Just the Same: Vedem, the Secret Magazine of the Boys of Terezín. The editors of this selection included Kurt Jiři Kotouč and Zdenĕk Ornest, two of the original contributors from Terezín.

Further reading
 Terezín. Council of Jewish Communities in the Czech Lands, 1965.
 We Are Children Just the Same: Vedem, the Secret Magazine by the Boys of Terezin. Ed. Zdenek Ornest, Marie Rut Krizkova, et al. Philadelphia: Jewish Publication Society of America, 1995. .

References

External links
 The website about the magazine Vedem (www.vedem-terezin.cz)
 An overview of the magazine, including a sample poem and article

Literary magazines published in the Czech Republic
Defunct magazines published in Czechoslovakia
Defunct literary magazines published in Europe
The Holocaust
Magazines established in 1942
Magazines disestablished in 1944
Czech-language magazines